Worlds I Create is the third full-length album from Norwegian black metal band, Pantheon I and was released in Europe on 29 July 2009 and in North America on 11 August of the same year.

As with the band's two previous albums the cover is a painting by Kjell Åge Meland.

Track listing
 "Myself Above All" – 7:09
 "Defile the Trinity" – 5:14
 "Serpent Christ" – 5:49
 "Ascending" – 5:52
 "Burn The Cross"– 4:55
 "Bannlyst" – 5:44
 "The Last Stand" – 5:33
 "Written In Sand" – 7:04

Credits
Andrè Kvebek – vocals, guitar
John Espen Sagstad – guitar
Mads Guldbekkhei – drums
Tor Risdal Stavenes – bass
Live Julianne Kostøl – cello
Additional guest vocals on “Ascending” by Jonas Renkse of Katatonia.
All music and lyrics by Pantheon I.
Engineered, Mixed and Mastered by Marius Strand
Paintings by Kjell Åge Meland.
Bandphoto by Espen Krokhaug

References

 Metal Archives
 Pantheon I official website

2009 albums
Pantheon I albums